This list of fossil reptiles described in 2023 is a list of new taxa of fossil reptiles that were described during the year 2023, as well as other significant discoveries and events related to reptile paleontology that occurred in 2023.

Squamates

Squamate research
 Redescription of Palaeogekko risgoviensis is published by Villa (2023), who confirms the validity of this species as a distinct taxon, and interprets it as a non-eublepharid gekkonoid of uncertain affinities.
 Loréal et al. (2023) describe new fossil material of Pseudopus pannonicus from the Neogene localities across Moldova, Russia and Ukraine, including fossils from the Turolian localities Gaverdovsky and Volchaya Balka in North Caucasus representing the easternmost or some of the easternmost known occurrences of this species, and revise the diagnostic features of P. pannonicus.
 LeBlanc et al. (2023) report that tooth replacement in extant snakes occurs by resorption of dentine by odontoclasts from within the pulp of the tooth, and that this mechanism was already present in Yurlunggur and Portugalophis.
 Shi et al. (2023) describe an assemblage of early Pliocene snake fossils entombed with the mammalian fauna from Houxushan (Queshan, Henan, China), and interpret the studied fossils as indicative of a warmer and more humid climate in this region during the early Pliocene.
 Georgalis et al. (2023) describe fossil material of lizards and snakes from the Miocene localities in Anatolia (Turkey), including fossil remains tentatively referred to chameleons, potentially representing the oldest occurrences of chameleons from Asia reported to date.

Ichthyosauromorphs

Ichthyosauromorph research
 Kear et al. (2023) describe ichthyopterygian fossil material (including 11 vertebral centra which are substantially larger than those of typical basal ichthyosauriforms) from the Lower Triassic Vikinghøgda Formation (Svalbard, Norway), interpreting the internal structure of the studied bones as indicating that they belonged to a fully pelagic animal, and argue that ichthyosauromorphs might have originated before the Permian–Triassic extinction event.
 Redescription of the holotypes of Grendelius pseudoscythicus and G. zhuravlevi is published by Zverkov, Arkhangelsky & Stenshin (2023), who consider both species to be valid, indicating the presence of at least three species of Grendelius in the Middle Russian Sea during the latest Jurassic, and argue that there is insufficient evidence for synonymy between the genera Brachypterygius and Grendelius.

Sauropterygians

Sauropterygian research
 A study on the skeletal anatomy and phylogenetic relationships of Luskhan itilensis is published by Fischer et al. (2023).
 D'Angelo et al. (2023) describe a mature elasmosaurid specimen from the Maastrichtian Calafate Formation (Argentina), with histological features of the phalanx and vertebral apophysis otherwise found in juvenile individuals, and interpret this finding as contradicting the hypotheses that proposed that the maturation of elasmosaurid involved a shift in bone density which was related to migration from coastal waters to the open sea.
 O'Gorman & Otero (2023) revise the fossil material of Late Cretaceous short-necked plesiosaurs from New Zealand, and argue that only one specimen from the Tahora Formation and one from the Conway Formation can be confidently referred to the family Polycotylidae, while another specimen from the Conway Formation and one specimen from uncertain locality can be referred to this family with doubts.

Turtles

Turtle research
 Tong et al. (2023) describe a skull of a member of the species Solemys gaudryi from the Upper Cretaceous (Campanian) Bastide Neuve locality (Var, France), providing new information on the skull anatomy of helochelydrid turtles.
 Pérez-García, Camilo & Ortega (2023) describe new fossil material of Hylaeochelys kappa from the Tithonian Freixial Formation (Portugal), providing new information on the anatomy and intraspecific variability in this species.
 Martín-Jiménez & Pérez-García (2023) present the reconstruction of the skull and neuroanatomical structures of the holotype of Euraxemys essweini.
 A study on the ecology of Araripemys barretoi is published by Batista, Carvalho & de la Fuente (2023).
 Smith, Berg & Adrian (2023) describe a well-preserved skull of a specimen of Plesiobaena antiqua from the Judith River Formation (Montana, United States), providing new information on the morphology of the middle and inner ear and endocast of baenids.
 Description of the anatomy of the skull and mandible of Plastomenus thomasii, and a study on the phylogenetic relationships and the evolutionary history of softshell turtles, is published by Evers, Chapelle & Joyce (2023).
 A study on the long bone microstructure of Protostega gigas is published by Wilson (2023), who interprets her findings as indicating that P. gigas, unlike the more basal protostegid Desmatochelys, had rapid bone growth patterns similar to those of extant leatherback sea turtles.
 Fossil material of a sea turtle is described from the Lutetian Santiago Formation, California by Poust, Holroyd & Deméré (2023), providing evidence of the presence of sea turtles in North Pacific during the middle Eocene.
 A study on the bone histology of fossil and extant angulate tortoises from South Africa, providing evidence of impact of environmental conditions on the growth of studied tortoises, is published by Bhat, Chinsamy & Parkington (2023).
 A study on the relationship of body size to climate and on the role of metabolism in governing size in turtles is published by Parker et al. (2023), who report that the Plio-Pleistocene fossil record of turtles from the Shungura Formation (Ethiopia) included tortoises which were significantly larger than any extant African taxon, but aquatic turtles did not reach significantly larger maximum sizes than extant eastern African turtles; the authors find the studied fossil record of turtles to be consistent with habitat reconstructions for the Shungura Formation, interpret it as indicating that temperature-dependent metabolism likely wasn't a dominant factor for body size sorting in turtles from the Shungura Formation, and argue that the extinction of the largest eastern African tortoises may have been driven, in part, by human exploitation.

Archosauriformes

Archosaurs

Other archosauriforms

Archosauriform research
 A study on the locomotor capabilities of Euparkeria capensis is published by Demuth, Wiseman & Hutchinson (2023), who conclude that it is unlikely that Euparkeria was facultatively bipedal, and was probably quadrupedal.

Other reptiles

Other reptile research 
 Van den Brandt et al. (2023) provide the first volumetric body mass estimate of Bradysaurus baini.
 A study on the structure and placement of the osteoderm cover of Scutosaurus tuberculatus is published by Boyarinova & Golubev (2023).
 A study on the morphology of the femora of members of Drepanosauromorpha, interpreted as indicative of increased capacity for femoral adduction and protraction relative to most other Permo-Triassic diapsids, is published by Pritchard et al. (2023).
 Redescription of the skull of the holotype of Bentonyx sidensis, including description of previously obscured anatomical details, is published by Sethapanichsakul, Coram & Benton (2023).

Reptiles in general
 A study on the relationship between femoral microstructure and posture in extant reptiles, and on its implications for the reconstruction of the posture of extinct reptiles, is published by Gônet et al. (2023), who find that the posture can be reliably inferred for extinct reptile taxa that preceded and followed the quadruped/biped and sprawling/erect transitions, but also that the inferences are more questionable for taxa contemporary with these transitions.

References 

2023 in paleontology